Social Circle High School is a public school facility serving grades 9-12. It operates under the Social Circle City School District, within the city of Social Circle, in the extreme southern portion of Walton County, Georgia, United States. Its current principal is Tim Armstrong.

Academics

Athletics

The Social Circle Redskins compete in Region 8-A Public of the Georgia High School Association.

Social Circle High Currently competes in the following athletic disciplines

Football
Competitive and Spirit Cheerleading
Cross Country
Air Rifle
Swimming
Basketball
Wrestling
Soccer 
Track and Field
Golf
Tennis
Bass Fishing

See also
 Native American mascot controversy
 Sports teams named Redskins

References 

Schools in Walton County, Georgia
Public high schools in Georgia (U.S. state)